The 2022 season was Djurgårdens IF's 122nd in existence, their 67th season in Allsvenskan and their 22nd consecutive season in the league. In addition to the Allsvenskan, they competed in the 2021-22 and 2022–23 editions of the Svenska Cupen, and entered the 2022–23 UEFA Europa Conference League at the 2nd Qualifying Round.

Squad

Season squad

Transfers

Loans in

Loans out

Transfers in

Transfers out

Released 

Note: Players will join other clubs after being released or terminated from their contract. Only the following clubs are mentioned when that club signed the player in the same transfer window.

Competitions

Overview

Club Friendlies

Allsvenskan

League table

Results summary

Results by round

Matches

April

May

June

July

August

September

October

November

2021–22 Svenska Cupen

Matches

Group stage
<onlyinclude>

Quarter-final

Semi-final

2022–23 Svenska Cupen

Djurgården were drawn away at Örebro Syrianska in the 2nd round of the 2022-23 Svenska Cupen on 10th July 2022.

Qualification

2022–23 Europa Conference League

Qualifying

Djurgården entered the 2022-23 Europa Conference League at the 2nd Qualifying Round after finishing 3rd in the 2021 Allsvenskan. Djurgården were drawn against Rijeka of Croatia, with the 1st leg away.

The 3rd Qualifying Round draw was made on Monday 18th July, which drew the winner of the tie against Rijeka with either Sepsi Sfântu Gheorghe of Romania or Olimpija Ljubljana of Slovenia, with the first leg away from home.

The Play-off Round draw was made on Tuesday 2nd August, which drew the winner of the tie against Sepsi Sfântu Gheorghe with either APOEL of Cyprus or Kyzylzhar of Kazakhstan, with the first leg away from home. The order of matches was reversed due to Apollon Limassol reaching the Play-off round of the 2022–23 UEFA Europa League.

All qualifying round draws were made at the UEFA headquarters in Nyon, Switzerland.

Matches

Djurgården won 4–1 on aggregate.

Djurgården won 6–2 on aggregate.

Djurgården won 5–3 on aggregate.

Group stage

Djurgården made the group stage, and were placed in pot 4 for the draw as the 4th lowest ranked team left in the competition.

The group stage draw was made in Istanbul, Turkey on Friday 26th August, and drew Djurgården in Group F with K.A.A. Gent of Belgium, Molde FK of Norway, and Shamrock Rovers F.C. of Republic of Ireland. The fixtures were announced on Saturday 27th August.

<onlyinclude>

Matches

Round of 16

Djurgården finished top of Group F and qualified for the round of 16 with the matches to be played in the 2023 season.

Statistics

Appearances

Goalscorers 

The list is sorted by shirt number when total goals are equal.

Hat-tricks

Own goals

Disciplinary 

Updated 6 November 2022The list is sorted by shirt number when total cards are equal.

Clean sheets 

The list is sorted by shirt number when total clean sheets are equal.

References

Djurgårdens IF Fotboll seasons
Djurgårdens IF season